Journal of Physics D: Applied Physics is a peer-reviewed scientific journal published by IOP Publishing, a subsidiary of the Institute of Physics in the United Kingdom. It was established in 1968 from the division of the earlier title, Proceedings of the Physical Society. It has a broad coverage, including five main focus areas: magnetism; photonics and semiconductors; plasmas and plasma-surface interactions; applied surfaces and interfaces; structure and properties of matter and renewable energy/sustainability. The current editor-in-chief is Huiyun Liu (University College London).

Abstracting and indexing 
Journal of Physics D is  abstracted and indexed in:

According to the Journal Citation Reports, the journal has a 2020 impact factor of 3.207.

References

External links
 

Physics journals
IOP Publishing academic journals
Publications established in 1950
Weekly journals
English-language journals
1950 establishments in the United Kingdom